Nifty Fifty or Nifty 50 may refer to:

 Nifty Fifty's, a Philadelphia area fast-food franchise
 Nifty Fifty, an informal term for 50 U.S. blue chip stocks in the mid-20th century
 NIFTY 50, an Indian stock market index
 Honda NQ50, also known as the Nifty 50
 Normal lens with a focal length of 50 mm